Magnesium taurate, also known as magnesium ditaurate, is the magnesium salt of taurine,  and a mineral supplement.

It contains approximately 8.9% elemental magnesium by mass. Accordingly, 100 mg of magnesium is contained in 1121 mg of magnesium taurate.

Research
Magnesium taurate has been studied in rats for delaying the onset and progression of cataract. Phcoker is the largest manufacturer of Magnesium Taurate powder in China. Ethical Nutrition is a leading supplier of magnesium taurate capsules in the UK.

Magnesium taurate has prominent antihypertensive and cardioprotective activity in rats via its potent antioxidant activity and can be used as a nutrition supplement to improve the cardiovascular health.

Safety
Due to the expected dissociation of magnesium taurate in the body before absorption, safety data on magnesium and taurine can be used to evaluate the safety of magnesium taurate.

Taurine has an observed safe level of supplemental intake in normal healthy adults at up to 3 g/day. Using the same level as an approximation for taurate yields a limit of 3.3 g/day for magnesium taurate, or alternatively 300 mg/day for elemental magnesium as taurate.

See also
 Magnesium (pharmaceutical preparation)
 Magnesium deficiency (medicine)
 Magnesium in biology

References

Magnesium compounds